Mukhtar Ahmed Ansari (25 December 1880 – 10 May 1936) was an Indian nationalist and political leader, and former president of the Indian National Congress and the Muslim League during the Indian Independence Movement. One of the founders of the Jamia Millia Islamia University he remained its chancellor 1928 to 1936.

Early life and medical career
Mukhtar Ahmed Ansari was born on 25 December 1880 in Yusufpur-Mohammadabad town in eastern Uttar Pradesh).

Educated at the Victoria School, Ansari and his family moved to Hyderabad. Ansari obtained a medical degree from the Madras Medical College and went to England on scholarship studies. He achieved the M.D. and M.S. degrees in 1905. In 1910 Ansari earned a Master of Surgery (ChM) from the University of Edinburgh for his thesis Treatment of syphilis by arylarsonates with special reference to recent research. He was a top-class student and worked at the London Lock Hospital and the Charing Cross Hospital in London. He was an Indian pioneer in surgery, and today there is an Ansari Ward in the Charing Cross Hospital, London, in honour of his work.

From 1921 to 1935, Ansari visited Vienna, Paris, Lucerne and London to meet with famed urologists, including Robert Lichtenstern, Eugen Steinach and Serge Voronoff, some of the pioneers of grafting animal testicles onto humans. In the last decade of his life, Ansari performed over 700 such grafting operations, meticulously recording 440 of them. From these experiments he published his book Regeneration of Man, which he shared with his close friend Mahatma Gandhi.

Nationalist activities

In 1898, while a student in Madras, Ansari attended his first All India Congress Sessions, which was presided over by Ananda Mohan Bose. In 1927, when the Sessions were held again in Madras, Ansari presided over the session 

Dr. Ansari became involved in the Indian Independence Movement during his stay in England. He moved back to Delhi and joined both the Indian Congress and the Muslim League. He played an important role in the negotiation of the 1916 Lucknow Pact and served as the Muslim League's president in 1918 and 1920. He was an outspoken supporter of the Khilafat movement, and led the Indian medical mission to treat the wounded Turkish soldiers during the Balkan Wars. (Syed Tanvir Wasti, The Indian Red Crescent Mission to the Balkan Wars, Middle Eastern Studies, Vol. 45, No. 3, 393–406, May 2009). In March 1920, he led a Khilafat Delegation that was sent to England. This delegation made speeches, met with cabinet ministers and the prime minister Lloyd George.

Ansari served several terms as the AICC General Secretary, as well as the President of the Indian National Congress during its 1927 session. As a result of in-fighting and political divisions within the League in the 1920s, and later the rise of Muhammad Ali Jinnah and Muslim separatism, Ansari drew closer to Mahatma Gandhi and the Congress Party. When he became the President of the Indian National Congress in 1927 on the invitation of Mahatma Gandhi, he spent all of his wealth for the Indian National Congress activities, which left him almost bankrupt. He spent his later life in writing and developing the Jamia Milia Islamia.

Ansari was one of the Foundation Committee of Jamia Millia Islamia and also served as the chancellor of the Jamia Millia Islamia university in Delhi soon after the death of its primary founder, Hakim Ajmal Khan in 1927.

Personal life
Ansari lived in a palatial house, called the Darus Salaam or Abode of peace. Mahatma Gandhi was a frequent guest when he visited Delhi, and the house was a regular base for Congress political activities.

Ansari died in 1936 en route from Mussoorie to Delhi on a train due to a heart attack. He is buried within the premises of Jamia Millia Islamia, a university in Delhi.

Progeny
Many members of Ansari's family remained in India after partition in 1947 and became politicians in free India. His immediate progeny and family members include:
Mohammad Hamid Ansari, former Vice President of India, is Ansari's grand-nephew.

Honours
Ansari Road in Daryaganj, old Delhi is named after him.
Ansari Nagar near AIIMS, New Delhi has also been named after him.

References

Indian independence activists from Uttar Pradesh
Presidents of the Indian National Congress
Jamia Millia Islamia
People from Ghazipur
1880 births
20th-century Indian Muslims
1936 deaths
All India Muslim League members
Madras Medical College alumni
Alumni of the University of Edinburgh
Founders of Indian schools and colleges